Jeffrey "Jeff" Lewis Hardy, OAM (born 13 March 1959) is an Australian swimmer with a vision impairment. Hardy was born in the New South Wales town of Narrabri. At the 1996 Atlanta Paralympics, he won two gold medals in the Men's 100 m Butterfly B2 and Men's 400 m Freestyle B2 events, for which he received a Medal of the Order of Australia, and a bronze medal in the Men's 200 m Medley B2 event. On 16 November 1997 in Brisbane, he set a 1500 m S12 world record that has remained unsurpassed as of August 2017, with a time of 18:57.10. At the 2000 Sydney Paralympics, he won a gold medal in the Men's 400 m Freestyle S12 event. In 2001, he was inducted into the Sunshine Coast Sports Hall of Fame.

References

Male Paralympic swimmers of Australia
Swimmers at the 1996 Summer Paralympics
Swimmers at the 2000 Summer Paralympics
Medalists at the 1996 Summer Paralympics
Medalists at the 2000 Summer Paralympics
Paralympic gold medalists for Australia
Paralympic bronze medalists for Australia
Visually impaired category Paralympic competitors
Australian blind people
World record holders in paralympic swimming
Recipients of the Medal of the Order of Australia
Sportsmen from New South Wales
1959 births
Living people
Paralympic medalists in swimming
Australian male freestyle swimmers
Australian male butterfly swimmers
Australian male medley swimmers
S12-classified Paralympic swimmers
20th-century Australian people